Rasmus Stoklund Holm-Nielsen (born 17 March 1984 in Fredericia) is a Danish politician, who is a member of the Folketing for the Social Democrats political party. He was elected into parliament at the 2019 Danish general election.

Political career
Stoklund was elected into parliament in the 2019 election, where he received 4,541 votes.

References

External links
 Biography on the website of the Danish Parliament (Folketinget)

Living people
1984 births
People from Fredericia
Social Democrats (Denmark) politicians
Members of the Folketing 2019–2022
Members of the Folketing 2022–2026